Tamazulapam del Progreso is a town and municipality in Oaxaca in south-western Mexico. The municipality covers an area of  km². 
It is part of the Teposcolula District in the center of the Mixteca Region

References

Municipalities of Oaxaca